Maggie Blue O'Hara (born March 16, 1975), also credited as Maggie O'Hara, is a Canadian actress noted for her voice acting. She is well known as the voices of  Madison Taylor in Cardcaptors and Shadowcat in X-Men: Evolution.

Career
O'Hara appeared in many television series and TV movies, including The X-Files, Da Vinci's Inquest, Hope Island, Neon Rider and three years as a regular on the CBC TV series Northwood and appeared in the made-for-TV movies Resurrection.

In 2005, O'Hara and her then husband, renowned Hong Kong sand-painting artist and animator Hoi Chiu, formed the All Theatre Art Association, which created shows and toured them internationally to places such as England, Canada, Taiwan, China, Singapore, Thailand, Australia and New Zealand. While living in Hong Kong, O'Hara provided voices for name-brand electronic toys such as VTech and cartoon series such as The Adventures of Hello Kitty & Friends.

In early 2015, after nearly 10 years in Hong Kong, she returned to British Columbia to live and is continuing with her voiceover work as well as performing and teaching acting skills and children's yoga. She is also a workshop facilitator.

Filmography

Animation roles
 Barbie and the Rockers: Out of This World – Additional Voices
 Brain Powerd – Hime Utsumiya
 Cardcaptors – Madison Taylor
 Dragon Ball: Curse of the Blood Rubies – Bulma (Funimation & BLT Productions dub)
 Dragon Ball Z – Bulma (Ep. 123–260 (Ocean Studios dub)
 Dragon Tales – Shelley (Zak Takes a Dive) and Windy (Sneezy Does It) (2001)
 Earth Maiden Arjuna – Juna Ariyoshi
 Finley the Fire Engine – D.J.
 Grandma Got Run Over by a Reindeer – Daphne Spankenheimer
 Gundam Wing: Endless Waltz – Mariemaia Khushrenada
 Infinite Ryvius – Cullen Lucciora
 Inuyasha – Karan
 Jin-Roh: The Wolf Brigade (movie) – Nanami Agawa
 Mary-Kate and Ashley in Action! – Romy Bates
 MegaMan NT Warrior – Mika
 Monster Rancher – Holly
 My Little Pony: Friendship Is Magic – Strawberry Sunrise
 My Little Pony Tales – Sweetheart, Moki, Halfnot 
 Ninjago: Masters of Spinjitzu – Ultra Violet (Seasons 8–9), Harumi's Mother, Tox (Season 9)
 Ranma ½ – Anna (Ep. 108)
 Ronin Warriors – Mia Koji (Násuti Yagyu) OAVs only
 Saber Marionette J and Saber Marionette R (OAV) – Lime
 The SoulTaker – Sayaka Tachibana
 The Adventures of Hello Kitty & Friends – Dear Daniel
 ToddWorld – Stella (Season 1)
 Video Girl Ai (OVA) – Ai Amano
 X-Men: Evolution – Kitty Pryde / Shadowcat

Live-action roles
 Cold Squad – Helen Larson
 My Son Johnny – Wendy
 Neon Rider – Jill
 Northwood – Nicole
 Other Women's Children – Wanda
 The X-Files – Young Woman
 Wiseguy – Mary Jane
 Beyond Belief: Fact or Fiction

References

External links

Canadian child actresses
Canadian voice actresses
Living people
Actresses from Victoria, British Columbia
Canadian expatriates in Hong Kong
Canadian singer-songwriters
Place of birth missing (living people)
Canadian television actresses
Musicians from Victoria, British Columbia
20th-century Canadian actresses
21st-century Canadian actresses
1975 births
20th-century Canadian women singers
21st-century Canadian women singers